The National-Christian Defense League (LANC) was a far-right political party of Romania formed by A. C. Cuza.

Origins
The LANC had its roots in the National Christian Union, formed in 1922 by Cuza and the famed physiologist Nicolae Paulescu. This group morphed in to the LANC in 1923. Much of LANC's ideas were framed within theological arguments which were created by Nichifor Crainic, who served as Secretary General of LANC.

The swastika became the symbol of Cuza's movement and appeared in its publications, booklets and electoral programs. Cuza claimed that the symbol was purely Romanian in character and denied that LANC had copied the Nazi party's symbol. 
 By 1927, the party banner became the flag of Romania with a swastika in the centre.

The LANC became associated with extreme anti-semitism, calling for a gradual withdrawal of rights for Jews which would include the withdrawal of political rights for all Jews, the withdrawal of citizenship for most and a gradual policy of reapportionment of Jewish land and businesses. In order to accomplish this they hoped to begin by excluding Jews from the professions and the upper echelons of the armed forces.

Growth
Initially the LANC gained some support and its blue shirted militia group, the Lăncieri, gained notoriety for their anti-semitic activities in the universities. Increasing its influence, the LANC attracted most of the followers of groups such as the National Fascist Movement and the National Romanian Fascia during the mid-1920s. Support for LANC was particularly strong in Bukovina, Maramures, Northern Moldavia and Transylvania and this central northern region was to prove most responsive to fascism in Romania throughout the 1920s and 1930s.

Decline
However, Cuza's leadership, characterised by his level-headed professorial approach, led to some discontent particularly amongst the group's youth and student movement, the Legion of the Archangel Michael of Corneliu Zelea Codreanu, where the prevailing mood was one in favour of violent action. As a result, LANC received a blow in 1927 when Codreanu and his Legion broke off to form a distinct movement (which ultimately emerged as the Iron Guard) and the LANC's stock fell somewhat.

Merger
The LANC managed to regroup and returned to the Chamber of Deputies at the December 1933 general election, winning nine seats, two fewer than at the 1932 election. The LANC had begun falling behind the Iron Guard and it soon became clear that it needed to expand if it hoped to have any power. As such, Crainic took the lead in organizing negotiations with Octavian Goga and his equally right-wing, anti-Semitic National Agrarian Party (which also won 9 seats in 1933) and the two parties merged to form the National Christian Party on 16 July 1935. At the 1937 election, the National Christian Party achieved 39 of the 387 seats in the Chamber of Deputies compared to 66 seats won by the Iron Guard's Everything for the Country Party. Nevertheless, Goga was chosen in December 1937 by King Carol II to form a government.

Goga’s government was formed on 29 December 1937 but lasted for only 45 days. However, it wasn’t slow in starting to implement its anti-Semitic program. It repudiated Romania's obligations under the Minorities Treaty imposed upon it at the 1919 Paris Peace Conference, and then stripped 250,000 Romanian Jews of Romanian citizenship, one third of the Romanian Jewish population. Jewish businesses were also closed down.

Electoral history

Legislative elections

References

External links
'Background and Precursors to the Holocaust' 

Political parties established in 1923
Defunct political parties in Romania
Fascist parties in Romania
Antisemitism in Europe
Christianity and antisemitism
Defunct Christian political parties
Political parties disestablished in 1935
1923 establishments in Romania
Greater Romania
Eastern Orthodoxy and far-right politics
Eastern Orthodox political parties
Romanian nationalist parties
Far-right political parties in Romania
Nazi parties